The Tim Bergling Foundation is a foundation created by the family of the Swedish DJ Tim Bergling, known as Avicii, to "honour his memory and continue to act in his spirit". Avicii died by suicide in 2018, probably the result of prolonged mental health issues. The foundation was originally set up to tackle mental health awareness and suicide prevention in order to help prevent other families from experiencing similar events; however, was later expanded to work on climate change, protection of endangered species, business management, and nature conservation.

History 
The Tim Bergling Foundation was announced by the family of Avicii on 26 March 2019. Following the inspiration of Avicii's philanthropy including House for Hunger, Tim Bergling's family stated "Tim wanted to make a difference — starting a foundation in his name is our way to honor his memory and continue to act in his spirit".
 
A posthumous album by Avicii titled Tim was released on 6 June 2019 with all of the proceeds going to the foundation. Avicii had been working on the album before his death and collaborators including Chris Martin, Vargas & Lagola, and Aloe Blacc were enlisted to finish the work. In addition, an official biography written by Måns Mosesson is set for release in 2020 with all proceeds also going to the foundation.

During 2019's International Music Summit, Tim's father, Klas Bergling, spoke out about the importance of recognizing and treating the early signs of deteriorating mental health, anxiety, and depression for performing artists and those working in the music industry, and outlining factors that can contribute to such conditions. He also outlined the work which the foundation wishes to achieve in order to help combat such issues.

Avicii Tribute Concert

On 5 December 2019, the foundation held the Avicii Tribute Concert for Mental Health Awareness at the Friends Arena in Stockholm. The concert saw David Guetta, Kygo, Dimitri Vegas & Like Mike, Nicky Romero, and Laidback Luke headlining, along with a number of vocalists that Tim had worked with including Aloe Blacc, Sandro Cavazza, Rita Ora, Dan Tyminski, Adam Lambert, Vincent Pontare, Audra Mae and Salem Al Fakir and others. A 30-piece orchestra was in place, fulfilling one of Tim's dreams for his music in a live setting. All profits went to the Tim Bergling Foundation. Following the start of ticket sales, the concert sold out in 30 minutes. A total of 58,163 people attended, a record attendance for the Friends Arena.

References

External links
Ericsson Globe changes its name to Avicii Arena. 
Tim Bergling Foundation official website
Avicii Tribute Concert official website

Avicii
Organizations established in 2019
2019 establishments in Sweden
Mental health organizations in Sweden
Suicide prevention